Modesty is a 2007 Spanish drama film directed by David Ulloa and Tristán Ulloa, based on the novel by Santiago Roncagliolo. Its cast features Nancho Novo, Elvira Mínguez, Natalia Rodríguez Arroyo, Celso Bugallo, Carolina Román, and Marcos Ruiz, among others.

Plot 
Set in Gijón and dealing with the theme of family isolation, the plot tracks the plight and secrets of a number of characters, including lonely boy Sergio (inclined to talk to the dead), dying father Alfredo (diagnosed with brain tumour), anonimously sexted adoptive mother Julia, self-hating lesbian sister Marisa, and the widowed grandfather.

Cast

Production 
Penned by Tristán Ulloa, the screenplay is an adaptation of the novel Pudor by Santiago Roncagliolo. The film was produced by Tesela PC, with the participation of TVE and Canal+. Shooting locations included Gijón.

Release 
The film was presented at the 10th Málaga Film Festival in March 2007. Distributed by Sogepaq, the film was theatrically released in Spain on 13 April 2007.

Reception 
Jonathan Holland of Variety deemed the film to be "gritty, sometimes grueling and with a tendency to over-schematize", but "absorbing" nonetheless owing to "superb across-the-board perfs and a script that slowly winds its emotional spring to a cathartic final scene".

Fausto Fernández of Fotogramas rated Modesty 3 out of 5 stars, singling out the portrayal of the "viscerality and fragility of the characters" as the film's standout, while citing the "insistence" on the homosexual subplot as a negative point.

Accolades 

|-
| align = "center" rowspan = "2" | 2007 || 10th Málaga Film Festival || Best Actress || Elvira Mínguez ||  || 
|-
| 42nd Karlovy Vary International Film Festival || Best Actress || Elvira Mínguez ||  || align = "center" | 
|-
| rowspan = "2" align = "center" | 2008 || rowspan = "2" | 22nd Goya Awards || Best New Director || David Ulloa, Tristán Ulloa ||  || rowspan = "2" | 
|-
| Best Adapted Screenplay || Tristán Ulloa || 
|}

See also 
 List of Spanish films of 2007

Informational notes

References 

Films set in Asturias
Spanish drama films
2007 drama films
2000s Spanish-language films
2000s Spanish films
Films based on Peruvian novels
Films shot in Asturias
Spanish LGBT-related films
2007 LGBT-related films